To Wish Impossible Things can refer to the following:

 "To Wish Impossible Things", a song by the Cure on their album Wish
 "To Wish Impossible Things", an episode from the first season of One Tree Hill